Ligia Gargallo is a Chilean chemist and university professor of the Pontifical Catholic University of Chile.

Career 
She works at the University of Tarapacá (Arica) and at the Pontifical Catholic University of Chile, in Santiago. She received a bachelor's degree in chemical pharmaceutical at the University of Chile in 1959, degrees in chemistry from Paris Dauphine University and Katholieke Universiteit Leuven, a doctorate in chemical sciences at the University of Liège in Belgium in 1972, and a doctorate in chemistry from Katholieke Universiteit Leuven. Her areas of investigation are focused in Polymers and Macromolecules. Her work has aided drug designers. She is the winner of the Prize L'Oréal-UNESCO to Women in Science 2007 and Chile's National Prize for Natural Sciences in 2014 because of the "pioneering work in the development of the chemistry of polymers and macromolecules".

Publications 
 chemical-Physical of Macromolecules in the interface air-water, Macromolecules. Spanish Academic publisher (2012-01-27)
 265 publications until the 2014.

Prizes 
 2007, Prize L'Oréal UNESCO to Women in Science
 2014, National Prize of Natural Sciences of Chile

References

External links 
 Pontifical Catholic University of Chile page on Ligia Gargallo (Spanish)

Academic staff of the Pontifical Catholic University of Chile
University of Liège alumni
Year of birth missing (living people)
Chilean chemists
L'Oréal-UNESCO Awards for Women in Science laureates
Living people
Chilean women scientists
21st-century women scientists
Members of the Chilean Academy of Sciences